Rebellious Daughters is a 1938 American crime drama film. It was the first feature film directed by Jean Yarbrough, and starred Marjorie Reynolds. The film's producer was Ben Judell of Progressive Pictures, known for low-budget exploitation films with provocative titles; other films released by Progressive the same year included Delinquent Parents and Slander House.

Plot summary
It is the night before the birthday of single child Barbara Webster (Verna Hillie). Her spoiled and unaffectionate mother tells her she will not be in town and she does not want her daughter to go with her where she's invited. Barbara, called also Babe, is quite disappointed about the coldness of her mother and relies on her father. Unfortunately, her mother tells her, he will be out of town as well. Barbara is left alone with her sadness about her parents not caring for her. That is what makes her call a friend Eddie to organize something for the evening. Eddie then asks Babe if she could "dig up a live one for" for his friend, Bill Evans, who is there with him. She answers, only the dead have to be dug up, and she will see if she can find something "dainty but dumb".

She calls an old friend, Claire Elliott. She would love to get out, but her father is rather severe and doesn't want her to go to night clubs. Babe nonetheless goes personally to talk with father Elliott and manages to persuade him. In the night club the two gentlemen leave the girls for some minutes to go and say hello to old friends. Meantime a woman, Flo Russell, comes to their table and tells them she works for Mr. Gilman, who owns an exclusive gown salon in New York and would be glad to have them as models in his shop.
The boys come back with the intention to go to another party. Claire is forced to go with the group. On the way they are caught by police and Claires father has to bring them home. He makes her a speech and forbids her to exit home. With Babe they decide to leave home and go to New York to work for Gilman. They are hired by Gilman but they soon discover that he has another racket going on in his shop: blackmailing rich customers photographing them in suspicious situations. The story evolves ...

Cast
 Marjorie Reynolds as Claire Elliott
 Verna Hillie as Barbara Webster (Babe)
 Sheila Bromley as Flo Russell
 George Douglas (actor) as Joe Gilman
 Dennis Moore (actor) as Jimmie Adams (Reporter)
 Oscar O'Shea as Dad Elliott
 Irene Franklin as Ma Delacy
 Nick Lukats as Jerry Girard
 Monte Blue as Charlie, alias Clint Houston
 Lita Chevret as Kelly alias Rita Houston
 Vivien Oakland as Mrs. Webster
 Dick Hogan as Bill Evans

References

External links

 

Rebellious Daughters at Rotten Tomatoes

1938 films
1938 drama films
American drama films
American black-and-white films
Films directed by Jean Yarbrough
1930s American films